Percocypris tchangi is a species of cyprinid in the genus Percocypris. It is found in the Salween and Mekong basins of Vietnam.

The fish is named in honor  of ichthyologist Tchunlin (or Tchung-Lin) Tchang (1897-1963), who was responsible for describing the other species in this genus.

References

Cyprinidae
Cyprinid fish of Asia
Fish of Vietnam
Taxa named by Jacques Pellegrin
Taxa named by Pierre Chevey
Fish described in 1936